The Ohio State University Golf Club is located at 3605 Tremont Road, Upper Arlington, Ohio, a suburb of Columbus. It was founded by L.W. St. John, (Ohio State University Athletic Director, 1912–1947).  The golf club has two classical golf courses called Scarlet and Gray.  The Scarlet was completed in 1938 and the Gray was finished later in 1940.  The dedication ceremony was held on May 18, 1940, when Bob Kepler (golf coach from 1938 to 1965), Chick Evans, Blanche Sohl, and Patty Berg played 18 holes on the Scarlet course.

Both the Scarlet and the much shorter Gray golf courses were designed by Dr. Alister MacKenzie, a world-renowned golf course architect.  The Scarlet course is rated as one of the top collegiate courses in the nation. In 2005 and 2006 the Scarlet Course underwent a major restoration project overseen by former Buckeye legend Jack Nicklaus that was intended to restore play on the Scarlet course to the way that MacKenzie had envisioned it.

In 1941, Ohio State made history when it hosted the first ever women's collegiate golf championship on the Scarlet course. In 1982, Ohio State hosted the final Association for Intercollegiate Athletics for Women (AIAW) Division I National Championship. In 1991, Ohio State hosted the NCAA Women's Championship, commemorating the 50th Anniversary of the national tournament for women on the course on which it was conceived. The women's program later went on to host the 1997 and 2006 tournaments as well. The Scarlet Course has also played host to 10 men's National Championships. Over the years the Ohio State Scarlet course has been the site of several U.S. Open qualifiers, U.S. Amateur qualifiers and the 1977 USGA Junior Championship.

References

External links 

Ohio State Buckeyes golf
Golf Club
Golf clubs and courses designed by Alister MacKenzie
Golf clubs and courses in Ohio
College golf clubs and courses in the United States
Sports venues in Columbus, Ohio
Buildings and structures in Franklin County, Ohio
1940 establishments in Ohio
Works Progress Administration in Ohio